The Lakes may refer to:

Places

Australia
 The Lakes, Western Australia, a locality of Perth
 The Lakes Important Bird Area
 The Lakes Golf Club, a golf course in Sydney

Denmark
 The Lakes, Copenhagen, three lake around the city centre

United Kingdom
 Lake District
 Lake District National Park
 The Lakes railway station, in Warwickshire

United States
 The Lakes Area, now known as Uptown, Minneapolis, Minnesota
 The Lakes, Minnesota, a census-designated place
 "The Lakes", a local name for Franklin Delano Roosevelt Park in South Philadelphia
 The Lakes, Las Vegas, a planned community
 The Lakes at Eagle, an apartment complex at Eagle, Idaho

Entertainment
 The Lakes (TV series), a 1997 British drama series  
The Lakes with Paul Rose, a 2018 British TV documentary series
 "The Lakes" (song), a 2020 song by Taylor Swift

See also
The Lake (disambiguation)
Lake (disambiguation)
Lake District (disambiguation)
Land o' Lakes (disambiguation)